Poeten og Lillemor i forårshumør is a 1961 Danish comedy film directed by Erik Balling and starring Henning Moritzen.

Cast

 Henning Moritzen as Poeten
 Helle Virkner as Lillemor
 Eva Hast Nystad as Lotte (as Eva Nystad)
 Ove Sprogøe as Anton
 Lis Løwert as Vera
 Anders Thornberg as Tvilling
 Kristian Thornberg as Tvilling
 Karl Stegger as Slagteren
 Bodil Udsen as Jordmoderen
 Dirch Passer as Bageren
 Judy Gringer as Bagerjomfru Lise
 Poul Bundgaard as Bagersvenden
 Helge KjærulffasSchmidt as Bilforhandleren
 Palle Huld as Rejseføreren
 Birte Bang as Forårspigen
 Suzanne Bech as Pinasup girl
 Carl Ottosen as Togpassager
 Kirsten Passer as Togpassager

References

External links
 

1961 films
1960s Danish-language films
1961 comedy films
Films directed by Erik Balling
Films with screenplays by Erik Balling
Films based on Danish comics
Live-action films based on comics
Danish comedy films